Ptisana purpurascens is a large fern belonging to the botanical family Marattiaceae. It has a globular rhizome with stipule-like fleshy outgrowths. The leaves are dark green, twice pinnate and up to 1 metre long. Every pinnule has up to six pairs of leaflets. The petioles are dark-purplish, hence the name 'purpurascens' meaning 'becoming purple'. The sporangia are fused in all Ptisana into a bivalvate synangium.

Conservation plans have been proposed for Ptisana purpurascens, an endemic of the distant Ascension Island in the South Atlantic, where a single population remains on Green Mountain. While the mature plants are still present in large numbers, long-term threats to its survival exist in the form of competition with alien invasive species like introduced plants such as Buddleja madagascariensis and grazing by sheep and rabbits. Successful reproduction is very rare, making the species highly endangered.

References

Gray, A., Palembe, T., Stroud, S. 2005. The conservation of the endemic vascular flora of Ascension Island and threats from alien species. Oryx 39: 449–453. 
See the ARKive site for additional information 

Marattiidae
Flora of Ascension Island
Near threatened plants
Ferns of the Americas
Plants described in 1853